Duke Nukem: Manhattan Project is a platform game developed by Sunstorm Interactive, produced by 3D Realms, and published by Arush Entertainment. It was released on Microsoft Windows on May 14, 2002, in North America and on June 14, 2002, in Europe. A port of the game would be released for the Xbox 360 on June 23, 2010, by 3D Realms directly, followed by an iOS port on January 9, 2014.

Setting
Manhattan Project features the humorously musclebound action hero Duke Nukem, this time fighting Mech Morphix, a mad scientist who is using a radioactive slime dubbed G.L.O.P.P. (Gluon Liquid Omega-Phased Plasma) to metamorphose creatures into deadly monsters in order to take over Manhattan island, New York City. These enemies include metamorphic alligators, giant cockroaches, and even the Pig cops from Duke Nukem 3D. Duke also faces a few enemies who are not mutants, such as Fem-Mechs, lethal whip-wielding gynoids. Levels in the game contain recognizable parts of New York City.

Gameplay
Duke Nukem: Manhattan Project was built using a 3D engine known as Prism3D. The levels and characters are fully three-dimensional, and both the camera and Duke can move along any axis, but movement is restricted to a two dimensional plane. Utilizing the 3D engine, the player can zoom in and out focusing either on the enemy approaching or an overall view of the field. Duke can crouch, run, jump and slide kick underneath small counter space.

The game is organized in 8 chapters, each one having 3 parts. In each part, the player must rescue a "babe" strapped to a GLOPP bomb and find a coloured keycard to unlock the way to the next part. At some parts, the player gets to use a jetpack to fly over large voids or hazardous ground. The controls are also quite easy to get used to, with buttons only for jumping, moving, firing, and weapon changing. Using a cheat, player can also move the camera to any angle and take screenshots. The game CD includes a level editor named "PrismEd", but level-creation activity for the game never reached popularity among the players, and only a tiny level editing community is currently active.

Manhattan Project is not a direct sequel to any earlier Duke game. Manhattan Project is much like the original Duke Nukem due to its many similarities, such as 'Mech Morphix' looking and acting very similar (e.g. half a metal face and also a mad scientist) to Dr. Proton, the main antagonist of Duke Nukem. The side scrolling element also pays homage to the original.

Duke's primary enemy in the game was originally supposed to be his old nemesis Doctor Proton, but this was changed to avoid possible continuity clashes with Duke Nukem Forever. (though in the end Forever does not feature Proton at all, the DLC for Duke Nukem Forever called The Doctor Who Cloned Me featured the return of Proton.)

Development
In 1996, George Broussard was interviewed about future 3D Realms projects: he said that a Duke Nukem side-scroller called Duke Nukem Forever was in production and was supposed to come out by Christmas 1997. The project was later cancelled, with the name Duke Nukem Forever reassigned to the true Duke Nukem 3D sequel. When Manhattan Project was first shown to the public, rumours began to spread about it actually being the cancelled Duke Nukem Forever side-scroller, but this has since been clarified: Manhattan Project is a game original to ARUSH. A port of Duke Nukem: Manhattan Project was released to the Xbox Live Arcade on June 23, 2010, for 800 Microsoft Points (MSP). The release includes two avatar awards (Jetpack and Duke Nukem logo T-shirt) that can be unlocked in game.

Legal status
In 2004 Manhattan Project developer ARUSH Entertainment was bought out by HIP Interactive. Soon afterwards, HIP went bankrupt. Because of bankruptcy proceedings, the legal rights to Manhattan Project were held by a court-appointed bankruptcy firm. 3D Realms had inquired about retrieving the rights, but had been unable to do so. This has been detailed a few times online by 3D Realms' webmaster Joe Siegler in their online forums,. In a June 2006 forum post, Siegler said of the situation:

Sometime after the bankruptcy, the official website for Duke Nukem: Manhattan Project was allowed to lapse and as was registered by a domain squatter. Fortunately, before all the materials were lost, Joe Siegler was able to recover a copy of the contents of the official Duke Nukem: Manhattan Project website from a former ARUSH employee, and now hosts the former contents on the 3D Realms Website.

In late February 2009, the online gaming distribution site GOG.com announced some Apogee Software titles as being available in the future for sale on their site. On this list was Duke Nukem: Manhattan Project.

Reception

The PC version received "generally favorable reviews", and the iOS version received "mixed" reviews, while the Xbox 360 version received "generally unfavorable reviews", according to the review aggregation website Metacritic. GameSpy called the PC version "A slick platform arcade game at a reasonable price... captures Duke perfectly; great system performance; clever use of 3D." GameSpot was more neutral toward the same PC version, saying, "It's straightforward and good-looking... the levels are huge, and most have several paths you can take." IGN called said PC version "a polished, tried, and true title... worthy of a recommendation, especially given its keen price point and familiar antihero." The same website, however, criticized the Xbox 360 version, calling it "a rip-off compared [to] what else is on the market" and "one stone of your past that's better left unturned."

Manhattan Project was a runner-up for GameSpots annual "Best Budget Game on PC" award, which went to Serious Sam: The Second Encounter.

References

External links
 Duke Nukem: Manhattan Project page at 3D Realms

2002 video games
IOS games
MacOS games
Windows games
Science fiction video games
Run and gun games
3D Realms games
Manhattan Project
Video games set in New York City
Video games developed in the United States
Video games with 2.5D graphics
Xbox 360 games
Xbox 360 Live Arcade games